Heiligkreuzsteinach is a town in the district of Rhein-Neckar in Baden-Württemberg in Germany. It is located about 25 km North-East of Heidelberg. In 1293 the community was officially mentioned for the first time. Until 1525 the administration of the town changed several times. Starting with 1525 it became part of the Electoral Palatinate (German: Kurpfalz). With the end of the Electoral Palatinate in 1803 Heiligkreuzsteinach became part of Baden and after the union of Baden and Wurttemberg in 1952 it became part of the new established German State Baden-Württemberg. Currently there are the following urban districts which form the mother community: Heiligkreuzsteinach, Lampenhain, Bärsbach, Vorderheubach, Hinterheubach and Eiterbach. The town council has twelve members and is presided by the mayor. The mayor is elected for eight years without term limitations. However, there is a retirement limit which was recently increased to 71 years. The current mayor of Heiligkreuzsteinach is Ms. Sieglinde Pfahl, who was first elected in 2013. 

There are two Nursing Homes and one Kindergarten in the village. In addition there are also various cultural and athletic organisations. The town has a normal German Infrastructure which includes an Elementary School (Higher Schools can be attended in the neighborhood), small shops, two doctors, one dentist and several restaurants. Two regional buslines connect Heiligkreuzsteinach with Heidelberg.  

Among the prominent sons of the village is Herman Lehlbach (1845-1904) who represented New Jersey in the United States House of Representatives from 1885 to 1889. The grandfather of American baseball legend Charlie Gehringer (1903-1992) emigrated from Heiligkreuzsteinach in the 1850s.

References

Rhein-Neckar-Kreis